Leptolalax melanoleucus is a frog species in the family Megophryidae. It is endemic to Thailand, although it has a relatively wide distribution near the Burmese border from the Khlong Saeng Wildlife Sanctuary (the type locality) in the central peninsular Thailand northwards to the vicinity of Pilok in Thong Pha Phum District, southwestern mainland Thailand; it is expected to be found in Burma. Males can be found calling at night near small streams.

References

melanoleucus
Endemic fauna of Thailand
Amphibians of Thailand
Amphibians described in 2006
Taxobox binomials not recognized by IUCN